The Southsider Shelter is a Native American rock shelter archeological site in Big Horn County, Wyoming.. The site has occupied from the late Paleoindian period to the Late Prehistoric period. Artifacts include projectile points and chipped stone. The site was added to the National Register of Historic Places on August 1, 2012.

References

External links
 Southsider Shelter at the Wyoming State Historic Preservation Office

National Register of Historic Places in Big Horn County, Wyoming
Archaeological sites on the National Register of Historic Places in Wyoming